Cravolândia (Portuguese: Cloveland) is a municipality in the state of Bahia in the North-East region of Brazil. It borders the municipalities of Santa Inês, Itaquara, Ubaíra and Wenceslau Guimarães.

History

Cravolândia takes its name from the first mayor of the municipality, Mario da Silva Cravo. Cravo was a coffee producer and a noted a noted brand of coffee, Café Cravo, was produced and exported from Cravolândia in the 1950s. The coffee crop was decimated by agricultural pests in the 1960s. Small-scale coffee cultivation resumed in the 1970s but has never reached the levels of production of earlier decades.

Cravolândia was originally part of a region known as Olhos D'Água do Carrasco, a reference to its role as a place for drovers to stop for water in the movement of their livestock. This name was replaced by Igatiquira, an indigenous name meaning "small ounce". Cravolândia was originally part of the municipality of Jequiriça and later of Santa Inês. It became an independent municipality under Bahia State Law no. 1714 on July 16, 1962.

Footnotes

A.Mario da Silva Cravo is the father and grandfather of the Bahian artists Mario Cravo Júnior (1923-?) and Mário Cravo Neto (1947-2009). Cravo Júnior and Cravo Neto, however, were born and raised in Salvador, and were not residents of Cravolândia.

References

See also
List of municipalities in Bahia

Municipalities in Bahia